The Șomtelec is a left tributary of the river Nadăș in Romania. It flows into the Nadăș in Gârbău.

References

Rivers of Romania
Rivers of Cluj County